The 1965 North Dakota State Bison football team was an American football team that represented North Dakota State University as a member of the North Central Conference (NCC) during the 1965 NCAA College Division football season. In their third season under head coach Darrell Mudra, the team compiled an 11–0 record (6–0 against conference opponents). The team was ranked No. 1 in the 1965 AP and UPI small college polls.

Schedule

References

North Dakota State
North Dakota State Bison football seasons
NCAA Small College Football Champions
North Central Conference football champion seasons
College football undefeated seasons
North Dakota State Bison football